Brădetul River may refer to the following rivers in Romania:

Brădetul, a tributary of the Râșnoava in Brașov County
Brădet, a tributary of the Râul Mic in Alba County
Brădetul, a tributary of the Teleajen in Prahova County

See also 
 Bradu River (disambiguation)
 Brădișor River
 Brădetu (disambiguation)